Baji Rao may refer to

 Baji Rao I (1700-1740), Peshwa of the Indian Marathas
 Balaji Baji Rao ("Nanasaheb") (1720-1761), Peshwa of the Indian Marathas
 Baji Rao II (1775-1851), last Peshwa of the Indian Marathas